is a district located in Okayama Prefecture, Japan.

As of 2003, the district has an estimated population of 30,110 and a population density of 112.02 persons per km2. The total area is 268.79 km2.

Towns and villages
Wake

History
On September 1, 1963, the town of Hinase ceded the former village of Fukukawa to Akō, Hyogo Prefecture.
On March 22, 2005, the towns of HInase and Yoshinaga merged into the city of Bizen.
On March 1, 2006, the towns of Wake and Saeki merged to form the new town of Wake.

Districts in Okayama Prefecture